The Bandit Big Rig Series is a motorsport road racing series for semi-tractors which is held in the United States. The competition has the peculiarity that it is run on oval circuits, all of them short-tracks (circuits of less than 1 mile in length). It was created in 2017 to fill a void that existed in American motorsports after the demise of GATR racing.

Competition format
All the activity of each of the rounds of the championship takes place on the same day, from the early hours of the morning until late at night. On each race day, there are different tests in which all the participants of each round compete. Furthermore, unlike other competitions where points are only scored through the race, points are also awarded in the qualifying session. In this, all the trucks that occupy the first forty positions score.

After this, the Heat Races are held, where only ten trucks score. Then the Shootout are run, a type of race where they run one against one and only the winner of it scores points (one point). After these are the Challenges Races, with twenty trucks in the points area. Finally, the final race is run, with all the trucks, in which the winner of the round is decided and the first thirty-six trucks score.

Points earned by drivers

Classification session

Heat Races

Shootout

Challenges Races

Main-Feature Race

Champions

References

External links

Truck racing series
Auto racing series in the United States
2017 establishments in the United States
Recurring sporting events established in 2017